Lutheran High School of Orange County (commonly known as Orange Lutheran High School or OLu) is a private Lutheran high school in Orange, California, in the Los Angeles Metropolitan Area, founded in 1973. The school offers on-campus, online, and blended schedules for its students. Orange Lutheran is accredited by the National Lutheran School Accreditation Organization and the Western Association of Schools and Colleges. The school is also known for its Missions Program, which travels internationally and domestically on a year-round basis.

History

In the fall of 2003, the Alexandra Nechita Center for the Arts opened in the space once occupied by an old gym. The 740-seat performance hall is home to drama, dance, instrumental and vocal music productions, guest speakers and chapel services.

In 2014, the school completed a round of renovations as part of its "Beyond Expectations" program which added 40,000 sq. ft. of new buildings to the school’s footprint, including a new academic center, three new classrooms, and new collaborative meeting spaces for students, teachers and parents, in addition to the student union and a 12,900 sq. ft. covered lunch area.

In late 2004, Orange Lutheran partnered with the Apollo Group to offer online classes. In 2013, the school launched a new enrollment system and integrated tablets into its curriculum.

Academics
The school operates under a two semester system and eight periods on a block schedule. Four are periods offered each day that are 75 minutes in length. All students attend Daily Gathering, which includes Praise & Worship, Chapel and school activities.

Orange Lutheran incorporates 19 Advanced Placement classes into its curriculum. The Orange Lutheran Online (OLO) program allows for students to complete coursework online on a full-time basis. "Blended" schedules allow students to work online and attend on-campus classes. The school also offers a STEM program.

Service
All students are required to complete a minimum of 20 hours of "Service to Society" community service for each year of attendance. Five of the 20 hours will involve participation in one Service Day event each year.

Athletics
Orange Lutheran has 23 varsity athletic teams, including Ice Hockey, which won back to back state titles in 2015 and 2016, Surf, and a 2014 Track and Field State Title in the Pole Vault by Carl Johansson. Athletics are divided into three seasons throughout the year: fall, winter, and spring. The fall sports feature cross country, football, girls golf, surf, girls tennis, girls volleyball, and boys water polo. The winter sports feature boys basketball, girls basketball, ice hockey, boys soccer, girls soccer, girls water polo, and wrestling. The spring sports feature baseball, boys golf, boys lacrosse, girls lacrosse, softball, swim & dive, boys tennis, track & field, and boys volleyball. The school competes in the CIF Southern Section and the Trinity League.

Notable people
Alumni

 Dean Thompson, professional racing driver for Niece Motorsports

Cole Winn, professional baseball player
Gerrit Cole, professional baseball player
Aaron Corp, professional football player
Tyler Hilinski, quarterback for the Washington State University Cougars
Ryan Hilinski, quarterback for the Northwestern University Wildcats
Jason Martin, professional baseball player
Brandon Maurer, professional baseball player
Amber Neben, Olympic cyclist
Alexandra Nechita, painter
Austin Pettis, professional football player
Conner Sullivan, quarterback for the University of Southern California Trojans and Stuttgart Scorpions
Andrew Thurman, professional baseball player
Gabe York (born 1993), basketball player for the Fort Wayne Mad Ants.
Hannes Daube, American water polo player named to the United States Olympic roster for the 2020 Summer Olympics.

Faculty
Mark Langston, former baseball coach

References

External links
 School Homepage
 Orange Lutheran Online

Educational institutions established in 1973
High schools in Orange County, California
Lutheran schools in California
Private high schools in California
1973 establishments in California
Secondary schools affiliated with the Lutheran Church–Missouri Synod